Puerto Rico Highway 60 (PR-60) or Avenida Dionisio Casillas is a  freeway entirely located in Humacao, Puerto Rico. It connects Puerto Rico Highway 30 to Puerto Rico Highway 3 and has two exits:

 PR-198, Humacao Centro: Access to Hospital Ryder, one of the most important hospitals in Humacao; Downtown Humacao and East Las Piedras

 PR-924, Antón Ruiz: Access to Downtown Humacao and barrio Antón Ruíz.

History
The freeway was part of PR-30 before the latter, then called Puerto Rico Alt Highway 30 (or ramal), ended in the intersection with PR-909 near Mariana. When PR-53 was under construction, PR-30 was also extended to its terminus and the Department of Transportation and Public Works of Puerto Rico (DTOP) renumbered the final 1.9 miles (3 kilometers) of former PR-30 to PR-60.

Exit list

See also

 List of highways numbered 60

References

External links
 

060
Humacao, Puerto Rico